Gratwickia is a genus of flowering plants in the family Asteraceae.

Species
There is only one known species, Gratwickia monochaeta, native to South Australia.

References

Gnaphalieae
Monotypic Asteraceae genera
Flora of South Australia
Taxa named by Ferdinand von Mueller